Pachybrachis vestigialis is a species in the family Chrysomelidae ("leaf beetles"), in the order Coleoptera ("beetles").
Pachybrachis vestigialis is found in North America.

References

Further reading
 American Beetles, Volume II: Polyphaga: Scarabaeoidea through Curculionoidea, Arnett, R.H. Jr., M. C. Thomas, P. E. Skelley and J. H. Frank. (eds.). 2002. CRC Press LLC, Boca Raton, FL.
 
 Peterson Field Guides: Beetles, Richard E. White. 1983. Houghton Mifflin Company.
 Riley, Edward G., Shawn M. Clark, and Terry N. Seeno (2003). Catalog of the leaf beetles of America north of Mexico (Coleoptera: Megalopodidae, Orsodacnidae and Chrysomelidae, excluding Bruchinae). Coleopterists Society Special Publication no. 1, 290.

vestigialis